Nana is an Indian Malayalam-language film magazine published weekly by Kerala Sabdam publications. The magazine began publication in 1972 by R. Krishnaswamy Reddiar. It is headquartered in Kollam, Kerala. It is one of the largest Malayalam-language magazines in India by circulation.

References 

1982 establishments in Kerala
Film magazines published in India
Magazines established in 1982
Malayalam-language magazines
Mass media in Kerala
Weekly magazines published in India